Bruce Wilhelm (born July 13, 1945) is a former weightlifter and strongman from the United States.  He is a two-time winner of the World's Strongest Man competition in 1977 and 1978 and the author of numerous strength-related articles and books. He was a member of the executive board of the United States Olympic Committee. He was also on the Athletes Advisory Council for 8 years as well as the Substance and Drug Abuse Committee, the Sports Medicine Committee, and the Games Preparation Committee.

Athletics
Wilhelm was a high school track and field star for Fremont High School (Sunnyvale, California), and was the 1963 CIF California State Meet shot put champion as well as runner up in the discus competition. He won the Golden West Invitational high school shot put. He continued his athletic development at Stanford University, competing in shot, discus and wrestling.  He was the 1965 AAWU Wrestling Champion and finished the season undefeated with 21 victories. He finished 4th in the 1966 AAU National Freestyle Wrestling and Greco Roman Championships (unlimited weight class).

After one year at Stanford, Wilhelm transferred to Oklahoma State University where, in addition to throwing the shot, he was a member of the varsity wrestling team.

He placed in the top 10 US Men's Shot rankings for 1967, 1969, 1970, 1971, 1972, and 1973, and still is #251 on the all-time world shot put records, with a mark of 20.12m (66'-1/4") set on July 8, 1972 during the Olympic trials.

Weightlifting
Wilhelm became a weightlifter, and was the US National AAU Super Heavyweight Weightlifting Champion for both 1975 and 1976.  He won a silver medal for the United States at the 1975 Pan-American Games in Mexico City in the +110 kg division, and placed 5th at the 1976 Olympic Games in Montreal, QC, Canada.

World's Strongest Man
Wilhelm won the inaugural World's Strongest Man competition in 1977, and returned to win again in 1978.  He then spent several years helping to organize and officiate further contests.

References

1945 births
Living people
American male weightlifters
Olympic weightlifters of the United States
American strength athletes
Weightlifters at the 1976 Summer Olympics
Strength training writers
Sportspeople from Sunnyvale, California
Track and field athletes from California
Pan American Games silver medalists for the United States
Pan American Games medalists in weightlifting
Weightlifters at the 1975 Pan American Games
Medalists at the 1975 Pan American Games